Graf Helmuth Johannes Ludwig von Moltke (25 May 1848 – 18 June 1916), also known as Moltke the Younger, was a German general and Chief of the Great German General Staff. He was also the nephew of Generalfeldmarschall Graf Helmuth Karl Bernhard von Moltke, who is commonly called "Moltke the Elder" to differentiate the two.

Upon becoming the head of the General Staff, Moltke led the German Army from 1 January 1906 to 14 September 1914 during the opening  months of World War I. His legacy remains a matter of controversy due to his involvement in Germany's decision to go to war and the execution of the invasion of France and Belgium culminating in the First Battle of the Marne.

Early career
Helmuth von Moltke was born in Biendorf, Grand Duchy of Mecklenburg-Schwerin, and was named after his uncle, Helmuth Karl Bernhard von Moltke, future Generalfeldmarschall (Field Marshal) and hero of the Unification of Germany. During the Franco-Prussian War, Moltke served with the 7th Grenadier Regiment and was cited for bravery. He attended the War Academy between 1875 and 1878 and joined the General Staff in 1880. In 1882 he became personal adjutant to his uncle, who was then Chief of the General Staff. In 1891, on the death of his uncle, Moltke became aide-de-camp to Emperor William II, thus becoming part of the Emperor's inner circle. In 1898 he became commander of the 1st Guards Infantry Brigade and in 1902, being promoted to Lieutenant General, received command of the 1st Guards Infantry Division.

Rise to the General Staff
In 1904 Moltke was made Quartermaster-General; in effect, Deputy Chief of the General Staff. In 1906, he became chief on the retirement of Alfred von Schlieffen. His appointment was controversial then and remains so today. The other likely candidates for the position were Hans Hartwig von Beseler, Karl von Bülow and Colmar Freiherr von der Goltz. Critics charge that Moltke gained the position on the strength of his name and his friendship with the Emperor (who liked to call him Julius), with whom he was certainly far closer than were the other candidates. Historians argue that Beseler was too close to Schlieffen to have succeeded him, while Bülow and Goltz were too independent for William II to have accepted them. Moltke's friendship with the Emperor permitted him a latitude that others could not have enjoyed. Goltz, at least, saw nothing wrong with Moltke's performance as Chief. In December 1911, Moltke lectured the General Staff: "All are preparing themselves for the great war, which all sooner or later expect."

Marne campaign
Shortly before the outbreak of the First World War and the First Battle of the Marne in September 1914, Moltke was called to the Kaiser who had been told by Karl Max, prince Lichnowsky, that the British Foreign Secretary, Sir Edward Grey, had offered French neutrality under guarantee of Great Britain.  According to the historian John Keegan however, the Kaiser believed that Britain would remain neutral if Germany did not attack France. Whichever is true, the Kaiser, seeing that a two-front war could be avoided, told Moltke to divert forces from the western to the eastern front against Russia. Moltke refused, arguing that such a drastic alteration of a long-planned major mobilization could not be done without throwing the forces into organizational chaos and the original plan now in motion must be followed through. Years later, General Hermann von Staabs, head of the German railway division, would disagree in a book detailing a contingency plan that the German army had for such a situation. Grey's offer turned out to be a wishful misinterpretation by Lichnowsky and the Kaiser told Moltke to proceed as originally planned. Moltke's health, already stressed from this argument with his ruler, broke down as a consequence of German defeat at the first battle of the Marne, and on 14 September 1914, he was succeeded by Erich von Falkenhayn.

It is a matter of debate whether the "failure" of the Marne Campaign can be placed at Moltke's feet. Some critics contend that Moltke's weakening of the Schlieffen Plan led to German defeat. The records show that Moltke, who was concerned about Russia, moved 180,000 men east before the war. Many thousands more men were transported from the crucial right wing to the left wing facing France in Alsace and Lorraine. Most controversially, on 28 August, Moltke sent two corps and a cavalry division to reinforce Ludendorff and Hindenburg, just before the epic victory at the Battle of Tannenberg. The series of moves has been viewed by some historians as responsible for much of the strategic failure of the Schlieffen Plan as enacted in 1914. A number of historians, notably Zuber and S. L. A. Marshall, contend that the failure of Alexander von Kluck's 1st Army to keep position with Karl von Bülow's 2nd Army, thus creating a gap near Paris that was exploited by the French, is a more direct cause than any planning foibles on Moltke's part. The Schlieffen School disagrees and argues that Moltke lost control of the invading armies during the month of August and thus was unable to react when the First Battle of the Marne developed in September. While Moltke had lost touch with his field commanders, German operational doctrine had always stressed  (personal initiative) on the part of subordinate officers, more so than in other armies. Other historians argue that the multitude of strategic options Moltke faced and the danger of the Russian invasion of East Prussia clouded Moltke's judgement.

Although earlier in the campaign, German generals and the press had been proclaiming the campaign as good as won, on 4 September, Moltke was found despondent that the lack of prisoners meant that the Germans had not yet really won a decisive victory. Moltke may well have been overly preoccupied with the unsuccessful German offensive in Lorraine, and he issued no orders to the First, Second and Third Armies between 2 and 5 September whilst the Battle of the Marne was in progress.

Following the German retreat from the Marne, Moltke allegedly reported to the Kaiser, "Your Majesty, we have lost the war."

Later life

After Moltke handed over authority to Falkenhayn in September 1914, he was entrusted in Berlin with the office of Chief of the Home Substitute for the General Staff, which had the task of organising and forwarding the reserves together with controlling the territorial army corps while corresponding to those at the front. Moltke's health continued to deteriorate, and he died in Berlin on 18 June 1916 (aged 68) during the state memorial ceremony for Generalfeldmarschall Colmar Freiherr von der Goltz. He left a pamphlet entitled Die 'Schuld' am Kriege (The Blame for the War), which his widow Eliza intended to publish in 1919. She was dissuaded from doing so because of the problems it might cause. The pamphlet was designed to show the "chaotic" nature of events leading up to the war, to counter Allied accusations of warmongering by Germany. Army chiefs and the German Foreign Ministry were disturbed by its contents. General Wilhelm von Dommes was sent to advise Gräfin Eliza von Moltke against its publication. Having read the pamphlet, he confided to his diary that it "contains nasty stuff". Instead, Eliza published the more bland Erinnerungen, Briefe, Dokumente, a collection of her husband's letters and documents. Other material was archived. Some was later destroyed during the Second World War and the original pamphlet has not been accessible since.

Personal life
At sixty-six, Graf von Moltke was one of the older commanders of 1914 and in poor health, having suffered a stroke shortly before the outbreak of the war. These factors negatively affected his determination when he was under stress. His personal interests included music, painting and literature. While often assertive in manner, his character was assessed by the historian Barbara W. Tuchman as being essentially that of a self-doubting introvert.

Moltke was a follower of theosophy, which taught that humanity was an endless, unchanging cycle of civilizations rising and falling. Historian Margaret MacMillan connected his personal beliefs with his resigned approach to the possibility of a general war in the lead-up to the First World War. Like many of his colleagues on the German General Staff, he was heavily influenced by Social Darwinism. His view of international relations as merely a struggle for survival led him to believe that the longer the start of the war was delayed the worse things would be for Germany.

Honours
He received the following decorations and awards:
German honours

Foreign honours

Notes

References

Further reading
 Craig, Gordon A. The politics of the Prussian army 1640-1945 (1955). Online free to borrow
 Foley, Robert T. "Preparing the German Army for the First World War: The Operational Ideas of Alfred von Schlieffen and Helmuth von Moltke the Younger." War & Society 22.2 (2004): 1-25. online
 Fromkin. David. Europe's Last Summer: Who Started the Great War in 1914? (2005)
 Herwig, Holger H. The Marne, 1914: the opening of World War I and the battle that changed the world (2011).
 Meyer, Thomas (Ed.). Helmuth von Moltke, Light for the new millennium: Rudolf Steiner's association with Helmuth and Eliza von Moltke: letters, documents and after-death communications. Rudolf Steiner Press, London, 1997. .
 Mombauer, Annika. Helmuth von Moltke and the Origins of the First World War. Cambridge University Press, 2001.
 
 Tuchman, Barbara. The Guns of August, also published as August 1914, Macmillan Publishers, 1962.
 Zuber, Terence. Inventing the Schlieffen Plan: German War Planning, 1871–1914. Oxford University Press, 2002.
 
 Helmuth Johannes Ludwig von Moltke: Erinnerungen, Briefe, Dokumente 1877-1916. Stuttgart 1922

External links

 

1848 births
1916 deaths
People from Rostock (district)
People from the Grand Duchy of Mecklenburg-Schwerin
Colonel generals of Prussia
German military personnel of the Franco-Prussian War
German Army generals of World War I
Helmuth The Younger
Burials at the Invalids' Cemetery
German Theosophists
19th-century Prussian military personnel
Recipients of the Iron Cross (1870), 2nd class
Recipients of the Pour le Mérite (military class)
Grand Crosses of the Military Merit Order (Bavaria)
Grand Crosses of the Order of Franz Joseph
Commanders Cross of the Military Order of Maria Theresa
Grand Crosses of the Order of the Dannebrog
Knights Grand Cross of the Order of Saints Maurice and Lazarus
Recipients of the Order of the Crown (Italy)
Grand Cordons of the Order of the Rising Sun
Recipients of the Order of the Sacred Treasure, 1st class
Grand Crosses of the Order of Saint-Charles
Knights Grand Cross of the Order of Orange-Nassau
Grand Crosses of the Order of the Star of Romania
Grand Crosses of the Order of the Crown (Romania)
Recipients of the Order of St. Anna, 1st class
Commanders of the Order of Aviz
Grand Crosses of Military Merit
Recipients of the Order of the Cross of Takovo
Commanders Grand Cross of the Order of the Sword
Honorary Knights Commander of the Royal Victorian Order
Military personnel from Mecklenburg-Western Pomerania